Nausicaa (Greek: Ναυσικά: IPA: Naːusika) was the third opera by Australian composer and music critic Peggy Glanville-Hicks, composed from 1959 to 1960 and premiering in 1961. The opera is one of the two best-known works by the composer, the other being The Transposed Heads, and takes about 2 hours to perform. The bulk of the opera's libretto was sourced from Robert Graves' 1955 novel Homer's Daughter and is used as evidence to suggest that Homer's epic poem The Odyssey was actually written by a woman instead of Homer. In 1956, Glanville-Hicks enlisted the help of friend and librettist Alastair Reid to work on the libretto, in conjunction with Graves.

Premiere 
The opera was composed from 1959 to 1960, and premiered the year following in Athens, Greece, during the 1961 Athens Arts Festival in the Odeon of Herodes Atticus located at the Acropolis. During the festival, the opera was given three separate performances, and at the conclusion of its inaugural performance the audience provided a ten-minute ovation as a result of their adoration.

The original cast, comprising 150 persons, included both American and Greek singers, an all-Greek chorus, and an artistic/musical team consisting of Greek, Spanish, and American ethnicities. Following its premiere, the opera brought the composer wide acclaim for the rest of her career, although since its premiere no contemporary attempt has yet been made to re-stage the opera. A recording done by the Composers Recordings, Inc. was released right after the opera's premiere, and this helped bring the opera to a wider audience and secure the popularity of the opera.

Cast 

 Nausicaa: Teresa Stratas
 Odysseus: John Modinos
 King Alcinous: Spiro Malas
 Queen Arete: Sophia Steffan
 Chorus: Chorus of the Greek National Opera

Recordings 

 1961 (2007): Composers Recording Inc., Athens Symphony Orchestra, Carlos Surinach (conductor)

References 

Operas by Peggy Glanville-Hicks
Operas based on novels
1961 operas
English-language operas
Greek-language operas
Multiple-language operas
Operas